A referendum on the policies of Ion Antonescu was held in Romania on 5 March 1941. Under pressure from Nazi Germany, King Carol II had appointed Antonescu as Conducător on 6 September 1940. Voting was done orally, with voters answering yes or no. Silence was taken to be a "yes". The referendum was approved by 99.9% of voters. A second referendum on Antonescu's policies was held in November.

Results

References

Romania
1941 in Romania
1941 03
March 1941 events